The Ballistic Trajectory Extended Range Munition (BTERM) was a failed program to develop a precision guided rocket-assisted 127 mm (5-inch) artillery shell for the U.S. Navy. The program was originally named the Autonomous Naval Support Round (ANSR) and was developed by Alliant Techsystems.

The concept was similar to Raytheon's Extended Range Guided Munition with several simplifications and a larger rocket engine. The warhead was based upon that in the AGM-88 HARM anti-radiation missile, and was guided through GPS; however, unlike the ERGM it was intended to fly a strictly ballistic trajectory. Both programs were cancelled in 2008.

Specification
 Caliber: 127 mm (5 in)

 Guidance: GPS/INS
 Propulsion: Solid-propellant rocket engine
 Warhead: Blast-fragmentation

See also
 Long Range Land Attack Projectile
 M712 Copperhead
 M982 Excalibur

References

External links
 Ballistic Trajectory Extended Range Munition (BTERM) - ATK

Artillery shells